Brian Robert Matusz (born February 11, 1987) is an American former professional baseball pitcher. He played in Major League Baseball (MLB) for the Baltimore Orioles and the Chicago Cubs.

College
Matusz attended the University of San Diego, where he played on the school's baseball team as a starting pitcher.  Matusz, Josh Romanski, and Matt Couch anchored the Toreros rotation.

Matusz was named to the West Coast Conference Pitcher of the Year honors and finalist for the Roger Clemens Award.

In February 2022, Brian Matusz threw out the ceremonial first pitch before a San Diego baseball game against UNLV.

Professional career

Baltimore Orioles

Drafted fourth overall by the Baltimore Orioles in the 2008 MLB draft, Matusz signed a contract with the Orioles on August 15, 2008, the deadline to sign draft picks.

In spring 2009, he was invited to the Orioles spring training.  In June 2009, he was promoted from high Single-A (Frederick Keys) to a starting pitcher for the Double-A Bowie Baysox. He struck out 10 batters in his first start for Bowie on June 17. Matusz was named Baseball America's ninth best overall prospect mid-season in 2009. Before the 2010 season, Baseball America named him the fifth best prospect in all of baseball.

Matusz made his MLB debut on August 4, 2009, against the Detroit Tigers. On his MLB debut Matusz went five innings, allowing six hits, one earned run and striking out five. He earned a win in his effort. On September 14, the O's decided to shut Matusz down for the remainder of the season, wary of overextending the rookie in his first big league season.

He was named a starting pitcher on Baseball America's 2010 All-Rookie Team.

He missed the first two months of the 2011 season with an injury. He returned and got six starts and finished with a 1–4 record with an ERA above 7.00 before being demoted to Triple-A Norfolk on June 30 to work on his velocity. He was later recalled and continued to struggle, posting a 1–7 record and 9.84 ERA before his removal from the starting rotation in September.

Matusz began the 2012 season in the rotation, but was demoted to the bullpen in August. In the bullpen, Matusz excelled, striking out 19 with a 1.35 ERA in 18 appearances. He also did not allow a single inherited runner to score. He pitched the last three months of the season with a rectus abdominis tear, preventing him from sprinting, but not pitching. He had surgery in October to repair the tear, and was expected to be back for spring training.

In 2013, Matusz made the transition to full-time reliever, appearing in 65 games. He was 2–1 with a 3.53 ERA for the Orioles.

On May 23, 2015, Matusz was ejected from the game against the Miami Marlins in the 12th inning for cheating, specifically for having a foreign substance on his right forearm. He was the second pitcher to be ejected for a foreign substance in that past week. He was suspended for 8 games.

On February 4, 2016, Matusz and the Orioles agreed to a one-year deal to avoid arbitration. He was coming off a career-best season out of the bullpen, having posted a 2.94 ERA and 10.29 strikeouts per nine innings 58 relief appearances.

Atlanta Braves
On May 23, Matusz and the 76th pick in the 2016 Major League Baseball draft were traded to the Atlanta Braves in return for minor league pitchers Brandon Barker and Trevor Belicek. The Braves designated Matusz for assignment shortly after completing the trade.

Chicago Cubs
Shortly after being released by the Braves, the Chicago Cubs signed Matusz to a minor league deal. After being employed solely as a reliever since 2012, the Cubs assigned Matusz to be a starter in the minors. On July 30, 2016, the Cubs called him up to start against the Seattle Mariners on July 31. However, after a poor outing in that game, the Cubs designated him for assignment the very next day. He later cleared waivers and was outrighted to the Triple-A Iowa Cubs. Despite the fact he only appeared in one game for the Cubs during their 2016 World Series season, he was given a World Series ring.

Arizona Diamondbacks
Matusz signed with the Arizona Diamondbacks on a minor league contract for 2017. After struggling in the minors, he was released on May 16, 2017.

Acereros de Monclova
On July 23, 2019, Matusz signed with the Acereros de Monclova of the Mexican League. He was released on July 28, 2019. The Acereros won the Mexican League championship in 2019 following a 75-45 regular season record.

Long Island Ducks
On August 2, 2019, Matusz signed with the Long Island Ducks of the Atlantic League of Professional Baseball. He became a free agent following the season.

References

External links

1987 births
Living people
Acereros de Monclova players
All-American college baseball players
American expatriate baseball players in Mexico
American people of Polish descent
Arizona League Cubs players
Baltimore Orioles players
Baseball players at the 2007 Pan American Games
Baseball players from Colorado
Bowie Baysox players
Chicago Cubs players
Frederick Keys players
Iowa Cubs players
Long Island Ducks players
Major League Baseball pitchers
Mexican League baseball pitchers
Norfolk Tides players
Pan American Games silver medalists for the United States
Pan American Games medalists in baseball
People from Grand Junction, Colorado
Reno Aces players
San Diego Toreros baseball players
Surprise Rafters players
Tennessee Smokies players
United States national baseball team players
Medalists at the 2007 Pan American Games